Irish Association of Youth Science Groups (IAYSG) was an association of disparate science groups in Ireland in the 1980s.

The IAYSG was founded in 1982 and met regularly in Thomas Prior House in the Royal Dublin Society (RDS) in Ballsbridge, Dublin, Ireland.

In the early 1990s the IAYSG became Youth Science Ireland (YSI)), with the aim of the new organisation being to promote science amongst young people, and to promote the interests of its members.  YSI is or was a member of: AONTAS, the Irish national adult learning organisation; Youth and Environment Europe (YEE); the European Youth Science Network (EURYSN); the International Movement for Leisure Activities in Science and Technology (MILSET); and the International Network for Information on Science and Technology Education (INISTE). Science Link is the newsletter published by YSI.

References

External links

Organizations established in 1982
Youth organisations based in the Republic of Ireland
1982 establishments in Ireland